Diaphoroplax is a genus of chitons in the family Mopaliidae. It is considered a synonym of Plaxiphora Gray, 1847.

Species
 Diaphoroplax biramosus (Quoy and Gaimard)

References
 Powell A. W. B., New Zealand Mollusca, William Collins Publishers Ltd, Auckland, New Zealand 1979 

Mopaliidae